Kronprinsessan Victorias Fond (en:The Crown Princess Victoria's Fund) is working for helping disabled Swedish children
. Its founder is the Crown Princess Victoria of Sweden. The foundation is co-operating with Radiohjälpen.

References

Foundations based in Sweden